K731 Baek Sang Eo (White Shark) torpedo (Hangul: 백상어 어뢰) is a submarine-launched torpedo developed by the Republic of Korea Navy in 2004. Production was delayed for a year after a program error in the guidance system resulted in 2 failed tests in 2003. This glitch was fixed while developing the Blue Shark torpedo; a more lightweight variant. Production cost for each torpedo is at about 950 million won (US$790,000).

See also 
 Republic of Korea Navy
 List of torpedoes
 List of torpedoes by country

References

Torpedoes of South Korea
Military equipment introduced in the 2000s